Vasconcellea candicans is a small tree native to the western slopes of the Andes in southern Ecuador and Peru.

Description 
Small dioecious shrub or tree to 8 m high. Leaves ovate or almost rounded, with a slightly cordate base, margin entire or sometimes sinuately dentate and obtuse or acute apex; palmately veined; glabrous above, hairy below. Male inflorescence a small cyme with many flowers; tiny 5- or 7-lobed calyx; 5- or 7- lobed corolla; stamens twice as many as the lobes of the corolla, with linear-oblong anthers. Flowers greenish to purplish. Fruit ellipsoidal, yellow green at maturity, 10-18 x 4-6 cm; many seeds.

Vernacular names 
Chungay (in Ecuador).

Mito, uliucana, jerju, odeque (in Peru).

Uses 
Edible fruit.

Cultivation 
Propagated by seeds.

References 

candicans
Trees of Peru
Trees of Ecuador